The women's 1500 metres event at the 1971 European Athletics Indoor Championships was held on 14 March in Sofia. This was the first time that this distance was contested at the championships by women.

Results

References

1500 metres at the European Athletics Indoor Championships
1500